The Lamborghini Alar was a concept for a mid-engined sports car to be produced by Lamborghini LatinoAmerica. A unit was rumored to cost $750,000 each. The Alar was heavily based on the Diablo especially in the areas of chassis and engine. Other components are made locally by the company. The Alar has yet to be produced.

Performance 
The engine of the Alar is a heavily modified Lamborghini Diablo engine, it is a 7.7 L V12 able to produce  and can redline at about 7500 rpm. Initial Reports suggest the Alar could top  and could reach 0- in 4 seconds, subsequent official brochures have outlined its specifications. The estimated top speed of the Alar is  although these figures are highly debatable.

Styling 
Although it shares the same platform and engine as the Lamborghini Diablo its outer styling is completely different. Its styling is reminiscent of the Lamborghini Coatl, which is another car produced by Lamborghini Latinoamérica and designed by Joan Ferci. Like the Alar the Coatl is also based on the earlier Diablo.

References 

Rear mid-engine, rear-wheel-drive vehicles

Alar